The 2022 NCAA Division I Women's Lacrosse Championship was the 40th annual single-elimination tournament to determine the national champion of Division I NCAA women's college lacrosse. The semifinal and championship rounds will be played at Homewood Field in Baltimore, MD from May 27–29, 2022. All other rounds will be played at campus sites, usually at the home field of the higher-seeded team, from May 13–19.

Tournament field
All NCAA Division I women's lacrosse programs were eligible for this championship, and a total of 29 teams were invited to participate. 15 teams qualified automatically by winning their conference tournaments, while the remaining 14 teams qualified at-large based on their regular season records.

Teams

Bracket

Tournament bracket

*First and second round host

See also 
 NCAA Division II Women's Lacrosse Championship 
 NCAA Division III Women's Lacrosse Championship
 NCAA Division I Men's Lacrosse Championship

References

NCAA Division I Women's Lacrosse Championship
NCAA Women's Lacrosse Championship
Lacrosse
NCAA